Giuseppe Ciribini (20 January 1913 – 24 July 1990) was an Italian engineer and professor, considered the father of the discipline of architectural technology in Italy.

Biography
Giuseppe Ciribini was born in Milan on 20 January 1913. He studied engineering at the Polytechnic University of Milan where he graduated in 1936 with a dissertation about Italian rural housing, supervised by Prof. Giuseppe Sacchi. During World War II Ciribini served in the Corps of Engineers of the Regia Aeronautica (Italian Royal Air Force).

In 1948, after the war, Ciribini became professor of Elementi costruttivi (literally: building elements) in Milan. Later he moved to the Politecnico di Torino where, from 1966 on, he taught architectural technology. Besides Turin e Milan he also gave lectures in several others universities as in Venice, Ulm, Sao Paulo, Porto Alegre and Algeri.

In addition to his academic activity Ciribini conducted a significant professional activity as researcher and manager of several public institutions and committees. Among the most relevant of these were the direction of some projects held by the Consiglio Nazionale delle Ricerche, his cooperation with the Ente nazionale italiano di unificazione (the Italian representative organisation in ISO) and with the CEN). From 1955 to 1961 he directed  the Comitato Italiano per la produttività edilizia (Italian committee for productivity in construction industry), sponsored by the European Coal and Steel Community.

In politics he was a member of Democrazia Cristiana and, from 1960 to 1965, he sat as a representative of this party in the city council of Milan.

On 11 September 1989 Ciribini was appointed professor emeritus. He died in Turin on 24 July 1990.

A well-known student of Ciribini is Renzo Piano, whose dissertation Modulazione e coordinamento modulare (Modulation and modular coordination) was supervised by Ciribini in 1966.
From the academic activity of Ciribini in Turin grew two different trains of thought: one was guided by Lorenzo Matteoli and widely assumed a performance concept approach, while the second, led by Giorgio Ceragioli, applied architectural technology to border-line building contexts as third world slums and self-building.

Bibliography 
 La casa rustica nelle valli del Rosa, Volume 1, Giuseppe Ciribini, Centro nazionale universitario di studi alpini, 1943
 Organizzazione tecnica: impianto e meccanismi dei cantieri per l'edilizia, Giuseppe Ciribini,  Marzorati, 1952
 Tensostrutture, Giuseppe Ciribini,  UISAA, 1960
 Metodi e strumenti logici per la progettazione architettonica, Giuseppe Ciribini, Politecnico di Torino Facoltà di architettura, Istituto di elementi costruttivi, 1973, Torino.
 Introduzione alla tecnologia del design: metodi e strumenti logici per la progettazione dell'ambiente costruito, Giuseppe Ciribini, Franco Angeli, 1979 - 
 Tecnologia della costruzione, Giuseppe Ciribini, La Nuova Italia Scientifica, Roma, 1992
 Tecnologia e progetto: argomenti di cultura tecnologica della progettazione, Giuseppe Ciribini, Celid, 1995 -

Awards and decorations

See also
 Architectural technology

References

Engineers from Milan
1913 births
1990 deaths
Polytechnic University of Milan alumni
Academic staff of the Polytechnic University of Milan
Academic staff of the Polytechnic University of Turin
20th-century Italian engineers